The following is a list of the professional sports teams that have played games and been based in the state of Colorado:

Baseball

Major League Baseball
 Colorado Rockies

Minor League Baseball

American Association
 Denver Zephyrs (previously the Denver Bears; also played in the Pacific Coast League. Moved to New Orleans; now play as the Wichita Wind Surge)

Pioneer League
 Grand Junction Rockies Rookie-League for Colorado Rockies based in Grand Junction, CO
 Rocky Mountain Vibes Rookie-League for Milwaukee Brewers based in Colorado Springs, CO

Pacific Coast League
 Colorado Springs Sky Sox AAA League for Milwaukee Brewers (now play as the San Antonio Missions)
 Denver Bears (Relocated from Kansas City. Also played in American Association; later became the Denver Zephyrs)

Texas-Louisiana League
 Pueblo Bighorns (defunct)

Western League
 Colorado Springs Sky Sox (Western League) (defunct)
 Denver Bears (Western League) (defunct; replaced by the new Denver Bears team)

Basketball

American Basketball Association
 Denver Rockets (now play in the National Basketball Association as the Denver Nuggets)
 Colorado Kings Based in Denver, CO (defunct)
 Colorado Cougars Based in Greeley, CO (defunct)
 Colorado Crusaders Based in Colorado Springs, CO (defunct)

American Basketball League
 Colorado Xplosion (defunct)

National Basketball Association
 Denver Nuggets (also played in American Basketball Association; also known as Denver Rockets)
 Denver Nuggets (1948-1950) (also played in the American Basketball League, National Basketball League, Amateur Athletic Association, and National Professional Basketball League) (defunct)

National Women's Basketball League
 Colorado Chill (defunct)

Minor League Basketball

American Basketball Association
 Colorado Storm (defunct)

International Basketball Association
 Aurora Cavalry (defunct)
 Colorado Crossover (defunct)

National Basketball Association Development League
 Colorado 14ers (now play as the Texas Legends)

Football

Arena Football League
 Colorado Crush (defunct)
 Denver Dynamite (defunct)

Colorado Football Conference
Mile High Eagles (Formerly Englewood Eagles and Colorado Cobras) 
Northern Colorado Nightmare
Pueblo Steel
Colorado Springs Flames
303 Thrashers (Formerly Denver Pirates)
Colorado 76ers
Inactive or Defunct Teams Below
 Colorado Springs Cyclones (Defunct)
 Denver Dynasty (Defunct)
 Mile High Grizzlies (Defunct)
Colorado Stealth (Defunct)
North Metro Thunder (Defunct)
Northern Colorado Wolfpack (Defunct)
Metro State Roadrunners (MSU)
Colorado Springs Mountain Lions (UCCS)
Denver Sharks 
Pueblo Steel
Metropolitan Wolverines
Colorado Bulldogs
Colorado Springs Generals
Rocky Mountain Reapers
Mile High Knights
North Metro Red Raiders
Denver Titans
Greeley Stampede
Ft Collins Stars
Greeley Blaze
Denver Bulls
Denver Sharks
Grand Junction Outlaws
Colorado Springs Raptors
Rocky Mountain Raptors
Broomfield D.A.W.G.S.

Indoor Football League
 Colorado Crush (IFL) (previously the Colorado Ice; also played in United Indoor Football) (defunct)

Indoor Professional Football League
 Rocky Mountain Thunder (defunct)

Legends Football League
 Denver Dream (defunct)

National Football League
 Denver Broncos (Also played in the American Football League)

National Indoor Football League
 Colorado Venom (defunct)
 Denver Aviators (defunct)

Professional Indoor Football League
 Colorado Wildcats (defunct)

United Indoor Football
 Colorado Ice (later became the Colorado Crush; also played in Indoor Football League) (defunct)

United States Football League
 Denver Gold (defunct)

American Professional Football League II
 Grand Junction Gladiators

Hockey

National Hockey League
 Colorado Avalanche (moved from Quebec)
 Colorado Rockies (moved to New Jersey)

World Hockey Association
 Denver Spurs (moved to Ottawa; defunct) (also played in Western Hockey League and Central Hockey League)

Minor League Hockey

Central Hockey League
 Colorado Eagles
 Colorado Flames (defunct)
 Denver Spurs (also played in Western Hockey League and World Hockey Association) (moved to Ottawa; defunct)
 Rocky Mountain Rage (defunct)
 Denver Cutthroats (defunct)

International Hockey League
 Denver Grizzlies (moved to Utah; now play as the Cleveland Monsters in the American Hockey League)
 Denver Mavericks (moved to Minneapolis; defunct)
 Denver Rangers (moved to Phoenix; defunct) (also known as Colorado Rangers)

United States Hockey League
 Denver Falcons (defunct)

West Coast Hockey League
 Colorado Gold Kings (moved from Alaska; defunct)

Western Hockey League
 Denver Invaders (moved from Spokane) (moved to Victoria; defunct)
 Denver Spurs (also played in Central Hockey League and World Hockey Association) (moved to Ottawa; defunct)

Lacrosse

Major League Lacrosse
 Denver Outlaws (defunct)

National Lacrosse League
 Colorado Mammoth

Rugby

Major League Rugby 

 Colorado Raptors (previously the Glendale Raptors; defunct)

Division I Men 

 Glendale Merlins

Elite Women's Rugby 

 Glendale Merlins

Division I Women 

 Glendale Merlins

Soccer

Major League Soccer
 Colorado Rapids

North American Soccer League
 Colorado Caribous (moved to Atlanta; defunct)
 Denver Dynamos (moved to Minnesota; defunct)

Professional Arena Soccer League
 Denver Dynamite (defunct)

Minor League Soccer

A-League
 Colorado Foxes (moved to San Diego; defunct)

Major Soccer League
 Denver Avalanche (defunct)

United Soccer League
 Colorado Springs Switchbacks FC

Major Arena Soccer League
 Colorado Blizzard
 Colorado Inferno

Australian Rules Football

USAFL

Men's
Denver Bulldogs

Women's
Denver Bulldogs
Centennial Tigers